Village vehicles are a particular type of very light goods vehicle used on the outlying islands in Hong Kong where there is no road connection. They are often used to transport goods around the islands from the ferry pier where they are deposited. There is no standard layout for village vehicles, they may have wheels or treads, use a steering wheel or a tiller, the major defining feature is their size and use.

Officially, village vehicles are defined by the government of Hong Kong as:
 a motor vehicle, controlled either by a driver or a pedestrian, having an overall length not exceeding 3.2 metres and an overall width not exceeding 1.2 metres, constructed or adapted primarily for the carriage of goods on roads in rural areas or areas inaccessible or closed to other motor vehicles

The legal requirements of permit holders of village vehicles are governed by the Road Traffic (Village Vehicles) Regulations (Cap 374N). All village vehicles in Hong Kong start with the letters "VV" on their registration plates.

One company which manufactures village vehicles is the Kwok Tai Motor & Pump Company Ltd, however many others are of unclear origin.

Gallery

References

Commercial vehicles
Transport in Hong Kong
Islands District
Road transport in Hong Kong